DoYouDo, Inc. is a Beverly Hills, California company that owns the patent to an anonymous matching service designed to detect mutual attraction between friends or acquaintances based on confidential lists they create of people they are interested in. On September 7, 1999, Israeli businessmen  Gil S. Sudai and   David J. Blumberg patented the methodology, which represented a departure from the approaches employed by other online dating services and dating systems. It focused on matching up people who already had a non-romantic relationship offline, rather than matching up strangers, and was designed to help solve the problems associated with unwanted romantic overtures on the one hand, and inhibition resulting from fears of unrequited love on the other.

Several websites have implemented similar anonymous matching systems, including eCRUSH (claiming 350,000 legitimate matches).

History
DoYouDo, Inc. was incorporated on September 23, 1999, with Sudai serving as chief executive officer and (Spark Networks founder and current CEO) Joe Y. Shapira and (Spark co-founder and former co-chairman) Alon Carmel serving on the board of directors. A 2000 Business Wire article noted:

DoYou2.com's failure to catch on widely may have been due to the implementation of the scheme. Its marketing focused on the teen market to the exclusion of the adult market, had a high cheese factor, and concentrated on promoting a viral e-mail system instead of the matching system. The viral e-mail system allowed users to email anonymous DoYOUs through the website, asking, for instance, "doYOU Miss me?" with the recipient having to guess who sent it. If the recipient guessed incorrectly as to whom sent it, they would send their reply to the wrong person (perhaps one of their friends who hadn’t used the system yet); the recipient of the misdirected reply would in turn try to guess who sent it (or, perhaps, delete the email). The theory behind it was that this would lead to users introducing the system to their friends, expanding the customer base in the same way a virus spreads. This system was shut down in late 2001.

The firm was acquired by Matchnet.com in September 2000 for an undisclosed sum, dependent on certain success parameters, to be paid completely in MatchNet shares. The item "Acquisition of DoYouDo, Inc. $ − $ 1,820,000" appeared on the company's 2001 financial statements. Matchnet's 2002 Annual Report disclosed, "The purchase price was contingent upon the Company acquiring a separate entity, eCrush, before May 30, 2001, and was to range from $1,820,000 to $1,820,000 plus 70% of the difference between $5,000,000 and the actual purchase price of eCrush, if it was less than $5,000,000." eCRUSH, a company providing essentially the same service, had entered the market on Valentine's Day, 1999; today eCRUSH claims to have over 1.6 million users and to have legitimately matched over 350,000 people "through a proprietary and patented database process." The company never actually acquired eCRUSH.com.

MatchNet's 2004 Second Quarter Report claimed that its strategic rationale for the DoYouDo purchase was to "leverage the positioning and membership database of an existing online personals service" and "enhance and extend existing brands." An August 4, 2004, SEC filing said that the rationale was to "leverage acquired intellectual property."

MatchNet's 2003 annual report noted:

"Love detector" methodology
The patent's description notes:

Demand for the system is based on the fact that there are many situations in which asking a person out might have negative consequences if the feelings are not mutual. For instance, many people may be reluctant to ask out a good friend, for fear that if the answer is No, it will ruin the friendship once the other person knows how they feel. Co-workers may face a similar situation; if the co-worker rejects the romantic overtures, the work situation may become awkward.

In Sudai and Blumberg's "Love Detector" system described in their patent, users log in and enter a confidential list of friends and acquaintances who they are attracted to. The system periodically searches for pairs who have indicated a mutual attraction and notifies them, so that they can initiate a romantic relationship without fear of rejection. In the event that a person's feelings are unrequited, the object of their affection is never the wiser. As the patent abstract points out, "No notification occurs unless the system determines that a match in attraction or interests exists. If a first person's feelings or interests are not mirrored by a second person, the system will not notify either person and only the computer system will be aware of the first person's feelings for the second person."

The patent described several variations of the system, including one in which a user can choose to be notified 24 hours later; e.g., to allow time for the man to make the first move. It also provided for different types of attraction, e.g. "love," "like," and "desire." The system could be configured to only match users who shared the same type of attraction.

References
2003 Annual Report, MatchNet, May 27, 2004.
DoYOU2 FAQ, 1 January 2001.
DoYOU2 Introduction, 2 February 2001.
eCRUSH Press Release, 18 September 2000.
eCRUSH Frequently Asked Questions.
MatchNet, Inc. Form S-1, U.S. Securities and Exchange Commission, August 4, 2004.
MatchNet PLC Acquires doYOU2.com; Patented Technology Key Focus of Deal; Online Service Communicates Anonymous Feelings, Ideas, Interests, Business Wire, 31 October 2000.
MatchNet übernimmt doYOU2.com, German language article about doYOU2-MatchNet merger, Ad Hoc, 10 September 2000.
  "Method and apparatus for detection of reciprocal interests or feelings and subsequent notification", 7 September 1999.
 Tunisian tycoon calls for EU debt relief

Online dating services of the United States
Companies based in Los Angeles County, California